Spice Business Magazine is a British quarterly trade magazine for the Indian restaurant business community.

Content
In 1998, Spice Business Magazine was launched. It features articles about UK food manufacturers, food and drinks distributors, doctor surgeries, dentists, jewellery shops, travel agents, Asian entrepreneurs, cash and carries, halal groceries, wholesalers, and Indian restaurants - as well as prominent figures within the business community.

The magazine was set by British Bangladeshi Enam Ali to tackle the problems of the curry industry in the UK. In the beginning, the 42-page magazine was sold at 2 pounds.

See also
Business of British Bangladeshis

References

External links

Magazines established in 1998
1998 establishments in England
Business magazines published in the United Kingdom
Quarterly magazines published in the United Kingdom
English-language magazines
Magazines published in London
Bangladeshi cuisine in the United Kingdom
Mass media in Surrey
Food and drink magazines